Neil McKinlay (born April 25, 1981, in Langley, British Columbia) is a former a Canadian football linebacker for the BC Lions of the Canadian Football League. He was drafted by the Winnipeg Blue Bombers with the 33rd pick in the fourth round of the 2004 CFL Draft. McKinlay announced his retirement after six seasons with the Bombers, but was signed by the Lions after they had several players injured. He played CIS Football for Simon Fraser. As of 2012, he is a firefighter with the Winnipeg Fire Department.

References

External links
BC Lions bio

1981 births
Living people
Canadian football linebackers
Canadian football people from Vancouver
Players of Canadian football from British Columbia
Simon Fraser Clan football players
Winnipeg Blue Bombers players